Diglis Basin is a canal basin on the Worcester and Birmingham Canal. It is situated in Diglis in the centre of Worcester, England, near The Commandery (a command post during the English Civil War).

To the north is Tibberton (8.41 miles and 14 locks away) and to the west is Diglis Junction (0.25 miles and 2 locks to the west) where the canal meets the River Severn. It is the first basin (with associated amenities) reached after joining the canal from the River Severn.

Facilities available
With its central position in Worcester, Diglis Basin is very convenient for shops and leisure facilities in the centre of the city. It also has the following facilities of its own:

 Water point
 Rubbish disposal
 Dry dock

References

Worcester and Birmingham Canal
Transport in Worcester, England
Geography of Worcester, England
Tourist attractions in Worcester, England